According to the Book of Mormon, Alma was a Nephite prophet  who established the Church of Jesus Christ in the Americas during the reign of the wicked King Noah. One of the Book of Mormon's greatest figures, he is sometimes referred to as Alma the Elder to avoid confusion with his son, also named Alma, who is often called Alma the Younger. It is believed that Alma the Elder was born in roughly 174 BC; his son Alma the Younger was born in roughly 126 BC.

History

Alma's conversion
While a young man, Alma was one of several corrupt priests who served King Noah in the land of Nephi.  About 148 BC, the prophet Abinadi was arrested for preaching repentance and condemning the wickedness of Noah and his people. Brought before the king and his priests, Abinadi emphatically urged them to repent and obey the law of Moses and look forward to the coming of Christ. Of all who heard him, only Alma was touched by Abinadi's words. When Alma began to defend Abinadi the king had Alma cast out and Abinadi burned alive. Fleeing for his life, Alma went into hiding and wrote down what Abinadi had said before the court. Alma began to preach in secret, emphasizing Abinadi's teachings "concerning that which was to come, and also concerning the resurrection of the dead, and the redemption of the people, which was to be brought to pass through the power, and sufferings, and death of Christ, and his resurrection and ascension into heaven".

Alma's followers

At a hidden retreat in the wilderness called the waters of Mormon, Alma baptized his listeners and organized the church of Christ among them.  In time, King Noah found out where Alma's congregation was meeting, and, fearing insurrection, sent his army to destroy them.  Being warned by God of the army's coming, Alma quickly led his band of approximately 450 converts into the wilderness for eight days, finally stopping in an uninhabited land which they named Helam.  The people of Alma established the city of Helam there and prospered for many years, remaining faithful to God's commandments.

Return to Zarahemla
As the years passed, Alma and his people were discovered by the Lamanites and enslaved, placed under the authority of Amulon—a former priest of King Noah now united with the Lamanites—who began to persecute Alma's people, “put[ting] tasks upon them, and put[ting] task-masters over them”.  Finally, in about 120 BC, Alma's people escaped the Lamanites and were led by God through the wilderness for twelve days until they arrived in the land of Zarahemla, then the chief Nephite population center.  The people of Alma joyfully united with the Nephites and helped to strengthen the church of Christ in Zarahemla.  Zarahemla's King Mosiah soon authorized Alma to serve as the first high priest over the Church in Zarahemla.  Alma continued in this capacity for many years.

When Alma's son, Alma the Younger, and the four sons of King Mosiah came of age they rebelled against the church and "were numbered among the unbelievers".  However, as they went about to destroy the church an angel appeared and, in an experience similar to that of Saul on the road to Damascus, they were all converted.  Like Saul, their subsequent efforts on behalf of the church overshadowed their previous efforts to destroy the church.  Shortly before his death, Alma conferred the office of high priest upon his son.

The Book of Mormon states that Alma the Elder "lived to fulfil the commandments of God".  He died in about 91 BC.

Descendants
Alma had several notable descendants in the Book of Mormon narrative as shown in the family tree below:

Name 
At the time Joseph Smith translated the Book of Mormon, Alma was known only as a woman's name. Recent historical research indicates it may have been a masculine name among Jewish people around 600 B.C., which is the time Lehi left Jerusalem according to the Book of Mormon.

A potential Hebrew meaning of the name may be "lad of God" and “He [God] is bound.” Alma may possibly be traced to the Arabic root ‘alama/’ ‘alima, suggesting “knowing, erudite; distinguished; chief, chieftain."

See also 

 Book of Mosiah
 The Record of Zeniff

Notes

References
.

Further reading

External links
 Alma the Elder - the "Alma the Elder" entry in the Guide to the Scriptures at churchofjesuschrist.org

Book of Mormon prophets
Book of Mormon people